HMS Forte may refer to more than one ship of the British Royal Navy:

 , a French Navy 42-gun frigate launched in 1794, captured by the Royal Navy in 1799, and wrecked in 1801.
 HMS Forte, a 5th rate ordered in 1801 but subsequently canceled.
 , a 74-gun 3rd rate renamed HMS Forte when she became a receiving hulk in 1890.
 , a 38-gun 5th rate launched in 1814 and broken up in 1844.
 , a 51-gun screw frigate launched in 1858, hulked in the 1870s, and destroyed by fire in 1905.
 , a protected cruiser launched in 1893 and decommissioned in 1913.
 , a protected cruiser renamed HMS Forte after being hulked in 1915.

Royal Navy ship names